John Hern (also Herne) D.D. (d. 24 April 1707) was a Canon of Windsor from 1690 to 1707

Career
He was educated at Clare College, Cambridge where he graduated BA in 1677, MA in 1680 and DD in 1690.

He was appointed:
Rector of East Woodhay, Hampshire 1691-1707
Rector of East Shefford, Berkshire 1694-1707

He was appointed to the fifth stall in St George's Chapel, Windsor Castle in 1690 and held this until he died in 1707.

Notes 

1707 deaths
Canons of Windsor
Alumni of Clare College, Cambridge
Year of birth missing